Chris Dunn (born May 7, 1951) is an American athlete. He attended Newark High School and Colgate University and competed in the men's high jump at the 1972 Summer Olympics. He was inducted into the Delaware Sports Museum and Hall of Fame in 1989.

References

External links
 

1951 births
Living people
Athletes (track and field) at the 1972 Summer Olympics
American male high jumpers
Olympic track and field athletes of the United States